The 2003–04 UC Irvine Anteaters men's basketball team represented the University of California, Irvine during the 2003–04 NCAA Division I men's basketball season. The Anteaters were led by 7th year head coach Pat Douglass and played at the Bren Events Center. They were members of the Big West Conference.

Previous season 
The 2002–03 UC Irvine Anteaters men's basketball team finished the season with a record of 20–9 and 13–5 in Big West play.

Roster

Schedule

|-
!colspan=9 style=| Regular Season

Source

References

UC Irvine Anteaters men's basketball seasons
UC Irvine
UC Irvine Anteaters
UC Irvine Anteaters